Samizdat is the clandestine copying and distribution of government-suppressed literature or other media in Soviet-bloc countries.

Samizdat may also refer to:

 Samizdat (poetry magazine), a Chicago-based poetry journal
 Samisdat (zine), a 1960s United States zine
 Samisdat Publishers, Holocaust denier Ernst Zündel's publishing house (now defunct)
 Samizdat B92, a Serbian publishing house, part of the B92 radio and TV station
 Samizdat: And Other Issues Regarding the 'Source' of Open Source Code, a controversial book about Linux by Kenneth Brown
 Samizdat (video cartridge), a fictional movie also known as "The Entertainment," in David Foster Wallace's novel Infinite Jest
 Samizdat (Generation Warriors), fictional organization in Anne McCafferey's book Generation Warriors
 Samizdat (Interesting Times), in Terry Pratchett's book Interesting Times